Area codes 516 and 363 are telephone area codes of the North American Numbering Plan (NANP) in the U.S. state of New York. The numbering plan area (NPA) comprises Nassau County on Long Island.

History
When the North American Numbering Plan was established by AT&T in October 1947, Nassau and Suffolk counties, the lower Hudson Valley, and some areas adjacent were assigned area code 914. At the time, this area was largely coextensive with the New York state portion of the New York metropolitan area. In 1951, Nassau and Suffolk were designated as a separate numbering plan area with area code 516.

Despite Long Island's growth in both population and telephone service during the second half of the 20th century, this configuration remained for five decades. By the late 1990s, the proliferation of pagers and cell phones required further division to provide more telephone numbers for Long Island. On November 1, 1999, Suffolk was separated as a new numbering plan area with area code 631, while Nassau retained 516. Permissive dialing of 516 across Long Island continued until spring 2000.

Prior to October 2021, area code 516 had telephone numbers assigned for the central office code 988. In 2020, 988 was designated nationwide as a dialing code for the National Suicide Prevention Lifeline, which created a conflict for exchanges that permit seven-digit dialing. This area code was therefore scheduled to transition to ten-digit dialing by October 24, 2021.

Overlay
A 2021 NANP analysis of numbering resources projects exhaustion of NPA 516 during the second quarter of 2023. As a result, shortly after 10-digit dialing is implemented, additional relief is expected. An overlay of 516 has been recommended with a new area code, although a boundary-extension overlay has also been considered which would expand area code 934 (overlaying 631) to also overlay 516. In January 2022, it was announced that a new area code, 363, would overlay 516 beginning on January 20, 2023.

See also
List of New York area codes
List of NANP area codes

References

External links

 List of exchanges from AreaCodeDownload.com, 516 Area Code
 Interactive Map of Area Code 516

516
516
Nassau County, New York